Varieties of the color red may differ in hue, chroma (also called saturation, intensity, or colorfulness) or lightness (or value, tone, or brightness), or in two or three of these qualities. Variations in value are also called tints and shades, a tint being a red or other hue mixed with white, a shade being mixed with black.  A large selection of these various colors are shown below.

In specific color systems

Red (RGB)

Red (RGB), RGB red, or electric red (as opposed to pigment red, shown below) is the brightest possible red that can be reproduced on a computer monitor.  This color is an approximation of an orangish red spectral color. It is one of the three primary colors of light in the RGB color model, along with green and blue.  The three additive primaries in the RGB color system are the three colors of light chosen such as to provide the maximum gamut of colors that are capable of being represented on a computer or television set, at a reasonable expense of power.  Portable devices such as mobile phones might have an even narrower gamut due to this purity–power tradeoff and their "red" may be less colorful and more orangish than the standard red of sRGB.

This color is also the color called red in the X11 web colors, which were originally formulated in 1987.  It is also called color wheel red.  It is at precisely zero (360) degrees on the HSV color wheel, also known as the RGB color wheel (Image of RGB color wheel).  Its complementary color is cyan.

Red (CMYK) (pigment red)

Pigment red is the color red that is achieved by mixing process (printer's) magenta and process (printer's) yellow in equal proportions. This is the color red that is shown in the diagram located at the bottom of the following website offering tintbooks for CMYK printing: .

The purpose of the CMYK color system is to provide the maximum possible gamut of colors capable of being reproduced in printing.

Psychedelic art made people used to brighter colors of red, and pigment colors or colored pencils called "true red" are produced by mixing pigment red with a tiny amount of white.  The result approximates (with much less brightness than is possible on a computer screen) the electric red shown above.

Red (Crayola)

The color is defined as red in Crayola crayons.

Red was one of the original colors formulated by Crayola in 1903.

Red (Munsell)

The color is defined as red in the Munsell color system (Munsell 5R). The Munsell color system is a color space that specifies colors based on three color dimensions:  hue, value (lightness), and chroma (color purity), spaced uniformly in three dimensions in the elongated oval at an angle shaped Munsell color solid according to the logarithmic scale which governs human perception.   In order for all the colors to be spaced uniformly, it was found necessary to use a color wheel with five primary colors—red, yellow, green, blue, and purple.

The Munsell colors displayed are only approximate as they have been adjusted to fit into the sRGB gamut.

Red (NCS) (psychological primary red)

The color is defined as red in the NCS or Natural Color System (NCS 1080-R). The Natural Color System is a color system based on the four unique hues or psychological primary colors red, yellow, green, and blue.  The NCS is based on the opponent process theory of vision.

The Natural Color System is widely used in Scandinavia.

Red (Pantone)

The color is defined as red in Pantone.

The source of this color is the Pantone Textile Paper eXtended (TPX) color list, color No. 032M—Red.

Variations of red

Madder

The color madder is named for a dye produced from plants of the genus Rubia.

Brink pink

The color brink pink was formulated by Crayola in 1990.

Crimson

Crimson is a strong, bright, deep red color combined with some blue or violet, resulting in a small degree of purple. It is also the color between rose and red on the RGB color wheel and magenta and red on the RYB color wheel.

Pink

The web color pink is a light tint of red, but is often considered to be a basic color term on its own.

Salmon pink

This color which represents the pinkish tone of salmon is called salmon in Crayola crayons.
This color was introduced by Crayola in 1949. See the List of Crayola crayon colors.

Cardinal red

Cardinal red, also called cardinal, is a vivid red, which gets its name from the cassocks worn by cardinals. The family of birds takes its name from the color.

Apple red

 
Apple red

Poppy red

The color poppy red is named after the poppy flower.

Poppy red is a shade of pink-red. Lieutenant-Colonel John McCrae, a Canadian officer and surgeon in World War I, wrote possibly history's most famous wartime poems, called "In Flanders Fields", written in 1915. It helped the poppy (Papaver rhoeas) become a symbol of remembrance for soldiers who have died during the conflict and later conflicts.

Carmine

The color carmine is a vivid crimson. In its pigment form it mostly contains the red light with wavelengths longer than 600 nm, i.e. it is close to the extreme spectral red. This places it far beyond standard gamuts (both RGB and CMYK), and its given RGB value is a poor approximation only.

Spanish red

Spanish red, also known as torch red, is the color that is called rojo (the Spanish word for "red") in the Guía de coloraciones (Guide to colorations) by Rosa Gallego and 
Juan Carlos Sanz, a color dictionary published in 2005 that is widely popular in the Hispanophone realm.

Rusty red

Rusty red is a color formulated by Crayola in 1990 as one of the colors in its Silver Swirls specialty crayon box of metallic colors.

Chocolate cosmos

Chocolate cosmos, or red cosmos is the color of Cosmos atrosanguineus species.

The color is described as dark red, deep crimson, deeper burgundy, deep red chocolate, as dark hazelnut and velvety maroon.

Rosewood

The color rosewood is named after rosewood.

The first recorded use of rosewood as a color name in English was in 1892.
Actual rosewood exhibits a wide range of colors.

Imperial red

Imperial red is a representation of the red color of the Imperial Standard of Napoleon I.

The first recorded use of imperial red as a color name in English was in 1914.
Note: the RGB values for Pantone red and imperial red are identical.

Cordovan

Cordovan is a rich medium dark shade of red.

The first recorded use of cordovan as a color name in English was in 1925.

Fire engine red

Fire engine red is an intense, bright red commonly used on emergency vehicles; mostly on fire engines, other associated fire service vehicles, and ambulances.

Rose vale

The first recorded use of rose vale as a color name in English was in 1923.

Old rose

The color old rose, also known as ashes of rose, was a popular Victorian color. The first recorded use of old rose as a color name in English was in 1892.

Bittersweet shimmer

Bittersweet shimmer is one of the colors in the special set of metallic Crayola crayons called Metallic FX, the colors of which were formulated by Crayola in 2001.

Although this is supposed to be a metallic color, there is no mechanism for displaying metallic colors on a computer.

Light red

The color light red, though very similar to pink, is a shade of red that is roughly 50% lighter than red.

Light coral

The web color light coral is a pinkish-light orange color. It is also a HTML/CSS color name and a X11 color name.

Garnet 

The color garnet can be considered a dark tone of red, with some slight purple tints.

This color represents the hue of an average garnet gemstone, though garnets can range in color from orange to (very rarely) green.

Rose ebony

The first recorded use of rose ebony as a color name in English was in 1924.

Chili red

Chili red is the color of red chili peppers.  It is the shade of red used in the flags of Chile and South Africa.

Vermilion

Vermilion (sometimes spelled vermillion) is both a brilliant red or scarlet pigment, originally made from the powdered mineral cinnabar. It was widely used in the art and decoration of Ancient Rome, in the illuminated manuscripts of the Middle Ages, in the paintings of the Renaissance, as sindoor, an Indian cosmetic powder, and in the art and lacquerware of China.

Misty rose

The web color misty rose is written as mistyrose in HTML code for computer display.

The color name misty rose first came into use in 1987, when this color was formulated as one of the X11 colors, which in the early 1990s became known as the X11 web colors.

Turkey red

Turkey red is a color that was widely used to dye cotton in the 18th and 19th centuries.  It was made using the root of the Rubia plant, through a long and laborious process. It originated in India or Turkey, and was brought to Europe in the 1740s. In France, it was known as rouge d'Andrinople.

Salmon

The web color salmon represents the color of the flesh of an average salmon. However, actual salmon flesh can range in hue from a light pinkish-orange to a bright red (as is the case with sockeye salmon).

Coral pink

The color coral pink is a pinkish color.

The first recorded use of coral pink as a color name in English was in 1892. Late in 2016, the color sample was renamed Coral Red by Pantone, as the RGB, Hex and HTML color table showed the same color as being reddish, standing against popular belief of pinkish.

Still today, some people call Coral Red as Coral Pink due to this old attribution. 

The complementary color of coral pink is teal.

Cantaloupe Melon

The color cantaloupe melon is a representation of the color of the interior flesh of a cantaloupe, the most commonly consumed melon.

The first recorded use of melon as a color name in English was in 1892.

In 1958, melon was formulated as one of the Crayola colors.

Barn red

The color barn red is one of the colors on one of the milk paint color lists, paint colors  formulated to reproduce the colors historically used on the American frontier and made, like those paints were, with milk. This color is mixed with various amounts of white paint to create any desired shade of the color barn red.

Blood red

The color of blood red ranges from crimson to a dark brown-red and may have a slightly orange hue. In the RGB color spectrum, it often consists only of the color red, with no green or blue component; in the CMYK color model blood red has no cyan, and consists only of magenta and yellow with a small amount of black. It is frequently darker than both maroon and dark red.

In China, according to The Language of Color in China, dark blood red is sometimes referred to as "period (i.e., menstruation) red".

Tea rose

The color tea rose is the tint of the color that is used in interior design. This color is popular in interior design for painting bedrooms, especially among women.

There is a different color sometimes called tea rose, which is the color of an orange rose called a tea rose.  This other color is technically Congo pink.

The first recorded use of tea rose as a color name in English was in 1884.

Cinnabar

The color cinnabar derives from the mineral of the same name. It is a slightly orange shade of red, with variations ranging from bright scarlet to brick red.

Dark red

This is the web color dark red.

Fire brick

This is the web color fire brick.

Indian red

The name Indian red derives from the red laterite soil found in India, which is composed of naturally occurring iron oxides. The first recorded use of "Indian red" as a color term in English was in 1792.

Lust

Lust is a rich shade of red.

This color is not mentioned in the 1930 book A Dictionary of Color by Maerz and Paul but is found on the 1955 ISCC-NBS color list.

Maroon (HTML/CSS)

This is the web color called maroon in HTML/CSS.

Redwood

The color redwood is a representation of color of the wood of the redwood tree (Sequoia sempervirens).

The first recorded use of redwood as a color name in English was in 1917.
The source of this color is the Pantone Textile Paper eXtended (TPX) color list, color #18-1443—Redwood.

Scarlet

Scarlet is a bright red with a slightly orange tinge. According to surveys in Europe and the United States, scarlet and other bright shades of red are the colors most associated with courage, force, passion, heat, and joy. In the Roman Catholic Church, scarlet is the color worn by cardinals, and is associated with the blood of Christ and the Christian martyrs, and with sacrifice.

Tomato

The web color tomato is a medium reddish-orange color that approximates the color of common supermarket tomatoes. Many vine-ripened tomatoes are a bit redder. The color of tomato soup is slightly less saturated.

The first recorded use of tomato as a color name in English was in 1891.

When the X11 color names were invented in 1987, the color tomato was formulated as one of them.

Jasper 

The color jasper is named for red jasper, the most commonly known form of jasper; however, as with many gemstones, jasper can be found in many colors, from yellow to brown and even green. The color was formulated by Crayola in 1994 as part of their Gem Tones crayon set.

Rosy brown

The name for the web color rosy brown first came into use in 1987, when this color was formulated as one of the X11 colors, which in the early 1990s became known as the X11 web colors.

Rose taupe

The first recorded use of rose taupe as a color name in English was in 1924.

Fluorescent red

Fluorescent red is a light brilliant red color.

See also
Lists of colors

References